The QUEST Honors Program is a specialized program for undergraduate students at the University of Maryland, College Park.  The program accepts students from the College of Computer, Mathematical, and Natural Sciences, the Robert H. Smith School of Business, and the A. James Clark School of Engineering.

The name QUEST is an acronym for Quality Enhancement Systems and Teams.  The QUEST curriculum covers quality management, process improvement, idealized design, and systems design.  In the capstone course, QUEST students conduct consulting projects for corporate clients and present their results at a conference.

History
In 1990, the University of Maryland, College Park began a total quality initiative on campus. President William E. Kirwin and senior staff spent a year in total quality training, examining both administrative and pedagogical processes on campus to address the challenges of a dim financial forecast and declining enrollments. In October 1991, 18 months into the University of Maryland's efforts, IBM launched a grant competition for universities to improve total quality in higher education. IBM offered eight awards in the amount of $1,000,000 cash and $3,000,000 of IBM equipment, and received 204 applications. Of the eight universities to receive awards, the University of Maryland was the only school to include an undergraduate program as part of their total quality initiative, a program which began as the IBM-TQ program and continued in 1998 as QUEST.

Curriculum
QUEST students begin the program in their sophomore year, and continue in the program through their senior year.
They must take four QUEST courses: Introduction to Design and Quality, Applied Quantitative Analysis, Designing Innovative Systems and the QUEST Capstone Professional Practicum.
QUEST students also take one elective course.

Executive Directors
The current Executive Director of QUEST is Dr. Joseph P. Bailey, Research Associate Professor in the Decisions, Operations, and Information Technology department at the University of Maryland's Robert H. Smith School of Business.

Dr. J. Gerald Suarez, Professor of the Practice in Systems Thinking and Design, served as Executive Director of QUEST from 2005 to 2008. Building on the academic heritage of the program he was instrumental in accelerating QUEST's ascent. He instituted Systems Thinking and Design Thinking in the program as well as established the senior consulting conference as a public event to showcase the contributions of the students, among many other accomplishments. This event has become a staple in the program and a point of pride for the families of the students.

During his tenure student teams translated imagination into action and action into tangible impact. For example, a student team gained patent-pending status on an innovative product, other became a top ten finalist in a national green technologies challenge sponsored by GE and MTVu, another team developed a nonprofit organization to support the children living in orphanages throughout Ukraine and another team developed the weBike station-less bike sharing system. These projects reflected the new social consciousness of students today.

References

External links
 QUEST Home Page

University of Maryland, College Park